BMS may refer to:

Arts and entertainment
 Be-Music Source, a computer file format and Beatmania simulating game system
 Bristol Motor Speedway, Tennessee, US
 Blue Mountain State, a television series
 Bibliography of Music Literature (BMS or BMS online)
 Banco del Mutuo Soccorso, a rock band
 Benchmark Sims, a gaming community who authored the Falcon BMS modification to upgrade the original Falcon 4.0 combat flight simulator

Corporations and organizations
 Bayer MaterialScience, the former name of the materials science company Covestro
 Bemis Company (New York Stock Exchange symbol)
 BBK BMS, a Danish basketball club
 Bharatiya Mazdoor Sangh, a trade union organisation in India
 BMS Scuderia Italia, an Italian racing team
 BMS World Mission, a Christian missionary society
 British Mycological Society, to promote the study of fungi
 Bristol Myers Squibb, a pharmaceutical and health products company
 Boston Microtonal Society, US

Education
 Bachelor of Management Studies 
 Bedford Modern School, a school in Bedford, England
 Berlin Mathematical School, Germany
 B.M.S. College of Engineering, an engineering college in Bangalore, India
 B.M.S. Institute of Technology and Management, an engineering college in Bangalore, India

Science and technology
 Battery management system
 Battlefield management system
 Bridge management system 
 Building management system
 Borane dimethylsulfide, a chemical

Medical
 Bone marrow suppression
 Burning mouth syndrome, also known as glossodynia or stomodynia oral dysaesthesia
 Bare-metal stent, a coronary stent
 Bio-mechanical stimulation, vibration transferred to the human body

Physics
 Bondi–Metzner–Sachs group (or BMS group), an asymptotic symmetry group of General Relativity

Transportation
 Broadmeadows railway station, Melbourne (station code), Australia
 Bromley South railway station (National Rail station code), England
 Blue Air (ICAO code), a Romanian airline